Saybattal Mursalimov (20 November 1930 – 20 July 2014) was a Kyrgyzstani equestrian. He competed at the 1960 Summer Olympics and the 1964 Summer Olympics.

References

External links
 

1930 births
2014 deaths
Kyrgyzstani male equestrians
Soviet male equestrians
Olympic equestrians of the Soviet Union
Equestrians at the 1960 Summer Olympics
Equestrians at the 1964 Summer Olympics
Sportspeople from Bishkek